Edward Bagdon (April 30, 1926 – October 25, 1990) was an American football offensive lineman in the National Football League for the Chicago Cardinals and the Washington Redskins.  He played college football at Michigan State University and was drafted in the seventh round of the 1950 NFL Draft.

References

1926 births
1990 deaths
All-American college football players
American football offensive guards
Chicago Cardinals players
Fordson High School alumni
Michigan State Spartans football players
Sportspeople from Dearborn, Michigan
Players of American football from Michigan
Washington Redskins players